Shaun MacDonald (born 23 August 1994 in Stirling, Scotland) is a Scottish rugby union player who plays at the Flanker or Number Eight positions.

Rugby Union career

Amateur career

MacDonald plays for Stirling County. He won the National Youth Cup three years in a row with Stirling.

Professional career

He played for Glasgow Warriors against Canada 'A' at Bridgehaugh Park, Stirling on 30 August 2016.

International career

MacDonald has played for Scotland at various age grades. He played for the Under 17s, Under 18s and Under 20s.

References 

1994 births
Living people
Rugby union players from Stirling
Scottish rugby union players
Glasgow Warriors players
Stirling County RFC players
Rugby union flankers